West Hopkinton is a populated place within the town of Hopkinton in Merrimack County, New Hampshire, United States. West Hopkinton is well known for its agricultural center, preservation of historical landmarks and recreational activities within the village.

History
West Hopkinton was once a thriving village with many businesses such as several mills including the Kingsbury & Davis Machine Company, a creamery, grocery store and a number of working farms. West Hopkinton had its own post office which opened on May 29, 1857; a small railroad depot on the original Contoocook River Railroad line, the Rowell's Covered Bridge and New Henniker Bridge.

The dams were completed in 1962. The resulting flood control lands are connected by an artificial channel that crosses the height of land between the two river valleys.

References

Hopkinton, New Hampshire
Unincorporated communities in New Hampshire
Unincorporated communities in Merrimack County, New Hampshire